Zheng Shouren (January 30, 1940 – July 24, 2020) was a Chinese engineer and chief designer of the Three Gorges Dam. He had been engaged in the planning and design of the Yangtze River Basin and major water conservancy projects for a long time and had published more than 60 papers and 4 books. He was a member of the Communist Party of China.

Biography
Zheng was born in Yingshang County, Anhui, on January 30, 1940. After graduating from East China University of Water Resources (now Hohai University) in September 1963, he was assigned to the Yangtze River Basin Planning Office, where he was promoted to deputy chief engineer in 1991 and to chief engineer in 1994. He was chief designer of the Three Gorges Dam. He died of illness in Wuhan, Hubei, on July 24, 2020.

Contributions
He successively participated in the designs of Lushui Hydropower Project of Hubei, Wujiangdu Hydropower Project of Guizhou and Yangtze River Gezhouba Hydropower project, and took responsibilities for diversion design of the Wujiangdu as well as river closure design and cofferdam design of the Gezhouba Dam. He also joined and took charge of the designs of Qingjiang Geheyan Hydropower Project and Three Gorges Dam.

Works

Honours and awards
 1997 Member of the Chinese Academy of Engineering (CAE)
 1997 State Science and Technology Progress Award (First Class) 
 2004 Science and Technology Progress Award of the Ho Leung Ho Lee Foundation 
 2017 ICOLD Award
 2019 State Science and Technology Progress Award (Special Award)

References

1940 births
2020 deaths
People from Yingshang County
Engineers from Anhui
Hohai University alumni
Members of the Chinese Academy of Engineering
Chinese civil engineers
20th-century Chinese engineers